Florilegium is an early music ensemble based in London. It was founded in 1991 by the harpsichordist Neal Peres Da Costa and the flautist Ashley Solomon, who is now director of the group. It specialises in period performance of Baroque and early Romantic chamber music.

History 

The group was founded in 1991, and gave its first performance at the Blackheath Concert Halls in that year. It has since performed at the Wigmore Hall in London, and in many countries worldwide. A recording of the cello sonatas of Antonio Vivaldi with Pieter Wispelwey as soloist won an award, as did a recording of the chamber music of Georg Philipp Telemann.

See also 

List of early music ensembles

References

External links
"Florilegium (period instrument ensemble)", bach-cantatas.com

Instrumental early music groups
Early music orchestras
London orchestras
Musical groups established in 1991
1991 establishments in England